Ban Sadet is a tambon (subdistrict) of Mueang Lampang District, in Lampang Province, Thailand. In 2020 it had a total population of 10,423 people.

History
The subdistrict was created effective August 24, 1976 by splitting off 6 administrative villages from Ban Laeng.

Administration

Central administration
The tambon is subdivided into 17 administrative villages (muban).

Local administration
The whole area of the subdistrict is covered by the subdistrict administrative organization (SAO) Ban Sadet (องค์การบริหารส่วนตำบลบ้านเสด็จ).

References

External links
Thaitambon.com on Ban Sadet

Tambon of Lampang province
Populated places in Lampang province